= Stabri Monogo =

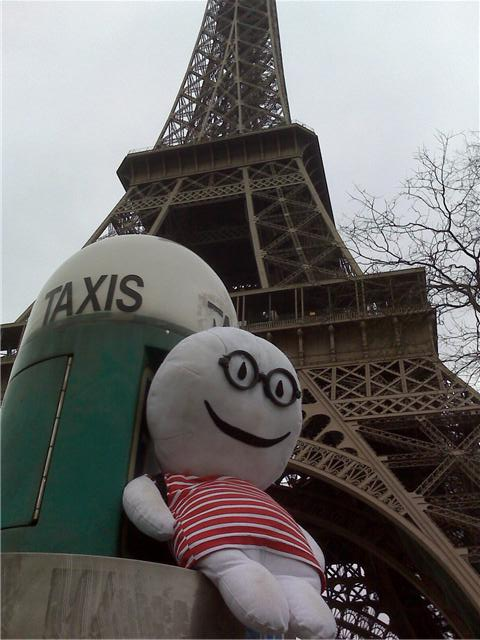
- First appearance: 2006
- Created by: Mariano Munuera and Ángel Téllez

In-universe information
- Alias: Stabri
- Species: Doll
- Gender: Male
- Occupation: Traveler

Stabri Monogo (better known as The traveler Doll or Stabri) is a popular character that passes from hand to hand and travels around the world. Created in 2006, it emerged as a spontaneous idea of two Spanish computer workers trying to see how well connected the Internet truly is.
